David Anenih (born August 15, 1999) is an American football outside linebacker for the Atlanta Falcons of the National Football League (NFL). He played college football at Houston, and originally signed with the Tennessee Titans as an undrafted free agent in 2022. He has also played for the Pittsburgh Steelers.

Personal life and high school
David Anenih was born on August 15, 1999, in Arlington, Texas. Anenih attended Mansfield Timberview High School where he played track and field and football and was also an honorable mention for class 5A All-State football in Texas.

College career
Anenih was rated as the number thirteen player in the state of Texas, and chose to attend Houston University over Kansas State University, Oklahoma State University, Texas Tech University, and others. As a true freshman, Anenih appeared in nine games where he totaled six tackles, of which two were sacks. As a sophomore, Anenih then played in thirteen games and improved his defensive numbers, becoming third on the team with four sacks. Anenih further improved his output on the Houston defense as a junior, registering five sacks which were tied for the team total. Due to the shortened year in 2020 caused by Covid-19, Anenih only was able to play in eight games. Despite this, Anenih still registered the fifth most total sacks in The American Athletic Conference. Anenih finished his final season for Houston at the peak of his college performance, appearing in fourteen games and was nominated to be on the All-American Conference First Team.

Professional career

Tennessee Titans
After going undrafted in the 2022 NFL Draft, Anenih was signed as an undrafted free agent by the Tennessee Titans. Anenih had his contract terminated while on the practice squad on September 14.

Pittsburgh Steelers
After being released from the Tennessee Titans, Anenih was signed to the Pittsburgh Steelers practice squad on October 11.

Atlanta Falcons
The Atlanta Falcons signed Anenih to their active roster from the Steelers' practice squad on December 20.

References

External links
Atlanta Falcons bio
Houston Cougars bio

Living people
1999 births
American players of American football
American football linebackers
Tennessee Titans players
Pittsburgh Steelers players
Atlanta Falcons players
Houston Cougars football players